Daniel Lifshitz (born 24 April 1988) is an Israeli former footballer.

Biography 
Lifshitz was born in Gothenburg, Sweden. His father was from kibbutz Nir Oz. His mother was a Swedish woman who had met his father in Israel. He moved to Israel as a child with his family, and grew up on Nir Oz.

Playing career 

On 17 June 2008, Lifshitz signed a four-year contract with Maccabi Netanya.
In the summer of 2010 he left Netanya and signed a contract with Maccabi Ahi Nazareth for one season. Later he moved to play for Hapoel Beer Sheva, Maccabi Umm al-Fahm, Hapoel Ashkelon, Hakoah Amidar Ramat Gan and most recently he signed with Maccabi Herzliya in Liga Leumit.
On May 20, 2018 Lifshitz retired from football.

Footnotes

References

External links
 Profile on Maccabi Netanya official website 

1988 births
Living people
Israeli footballers
Swedish footballers
Kibbutzniks
Swedish expatriate footballers
Maccabi Netanya F.C. players
Maccabi Ahi Nazareth F.C. players
Hapoel Be'er Sheva F.C. players
Maccabi Umm al-Fahm F.C. players
Hapoel Ashkelon F.C. players
Hakoah Maccabi Amidar Ramat Gan F.C. players
Maccabi Herzliya F.C. players
Hapoel Ra'anana A.F.C. players
Maccabi Tel Aviv F.C. players
Israel under-21 international footballers
Israeli Premier League players
Liga Leumit players
Swedish emigrants to Israel
Footballers from Southern District (Israel)
Association football goalkeepers
Footballers from Stockholm